The Keesee House is a historic house at 723 Arkansas Street in Helena, Arkansas.  It is a -story wood-frame structure, built in 1901 for Thomas Woodfin Keesee, the son of a local plantation owner.  It is an excellent local example of transitional Queen Anne-Colonial Revival architecture, exhibiting the irregular gable projections, bays and tower of the Queen Anne, but with a restrained porch treatment with Ionic columns.  The exterior is sheathed in a variety of clapboarding and decorative shingling, and there are wood panels with carved garland swags.

The house was listed on the National Register of Historic Places in 1983.

See also
National Register of Historic Places listings in Phillips County, Arkansas

References

Houses on the National Register of Historic Places in Arkansas
Queen Anne architecture in Arkansas
Houses completed in 1901
Houses in Phillips County, Arkansas
National Register of Historic Places in Phillips County, Arkansas